Chandica is a genus of moths of the family Nolidae erected by Frederic Moore in 1888.

References

Chloephorinae